The list of ship decommissionings in 2016 includes a chronological list of ships decommissioned in 2016.

References

2016
 
Ships